The St. Louis Cardinals 1995 season was the team's 114th season in St. Louis, Missouri and the 104th season in the National League.  The Cardinals went 62-81 during the season and finished 4th in the National League Central division, 22½ games behind the Cincinnati Reds.  It was also the team's final season under the ownership of Anheuser-Busch, who would put the team up for sale on October 25, 1995, ending a 43-season ownership reign.

Offseason
November 7, 1994: Scott Coolbaugh was released by the St. Louis Cardinals.
December 12, 1994: Tom Henke was signed as a free agent with the St. Louis Cardinals.
March 9, 1995: Darnell Coles was signed as a free agent with the St. Louis Cardinals.

Regular season
Rookie Mark Sweeney got a hit in seven straight pinch-hit at-bats, one short of the major league record.  Tom Henke became the seventh pitcher to notch 300 career saves.  Outfielders Bernard Gilkey (.298 batting average, 17 home runs), Ray Lankford (25 home runs, 24 stolen bases), and Brian Jordan (.296, 22 home runs) highlighted the Cardinals offense.

The Cardinals struggled offensively in 1995, finishing 28th overall in runs scored (563), hits (1,182), runs batted in (533), batting average (.247), on-base percentage (.314) and slugging percentage (.374).

Season standings

Record vs. opponents

Opening Day starters
Scott Cooper
Bernard Gilkey
Ken Hill
Brian Jordan
Ray Lankford
Manuel Lee
John Mabry
Tom Pagnozzi
Ozzie Smith

Transactions
 April 5, 1995: Ken Hill was traded by the Montreal Expos to the St. Louis Cardinals for Kirk Bullinger, Bryan Eversgerd, and Da Rond Stovall.
 April 9, 1995: Mark Whiten was traded by the St. Louis Cardinals with Rheal Cormier to the Boston Red Sox for Cory Bailey and Scott Cooper.
April 18, 1995: Manuel Lee was signed as a free agent with the St. Louis Cardinals.
May 2, 1995: Greg Cadaret was signed as a free agent with the St. Louis Cardinals.
June 6, 1995: Greg Cadaret was released by the St. Louis Cardinals.
June 8, 1995: Chris Sabo was signed as a free agent with the St. Louis Cardinals.
June 22, 1995: Manuel Lee was released by the St. Louis Cardinals.
July 9, 1995: Mark Sweeney was traded by the California Angels to the St. Louis Cardinals for John Habyan.
 July 27, 1995: Ken Hill was traded by the St. Louis Cardinals to the Cleveland Indians for David Bell, Rick Heiserman, and Pepe McNeal (minors).
 August 25, 1995: Darnell Coles was released by the St. Louis Cardinals.
 September 11, 1995: Chris Sabo was released by the St. Louis Cardinals.

Roster

Player stats

Batting

Starters by position 
Note: Pos = Position; G = Games played; AB = At bats; H = Hits; Avg. = Batting average; HR = Home runs; RBI = Runs batted in

Other batters 
Note: G = Games played; AB = At bats; H = Hits; Avg. = Batting average; HR = Home runs; RBI = Runs batted in

Pitching

Starting pitchers 
Note: G = Games pitched; IP = Innings pitched; W = Wins; L = Losses; ERA = Earned run average; SO = Strikeouts

Other pitchers 
Note: G = Games pitched; IP = Innings pitched; W = Wins; L = Losses; ERA = Earned run average; SO = Strikeouts

Relief pitchers 
Note: G = Games pitched; W = Wins; L = Losses; SV = Saves; ERA = Earned run average; SO = Strikeouts

Awards and honors
 Ozzie Smith, Shortstop, Roberto Clemente Award

Farm system

LEAGUE CHAMPIONS: Louisville

References

External links
1995 St. Louis Cardinals at Baseball Reference
1995 St. Louis Cardinals team page at www.baseball-almanac.com

St. Louis Cardinals seasons
Saint Louis Cardinals
St Lou